The Multimedia over Coax Alliance (MoCA) is an international standards consortium that publishes specifications for networking over coaxial cable. The technology was originally developed to distribute IP television in homes using existing cabling, but is now used as a general-purpose Ethernet link where it is inconvenient or undesirable to replace existing coaxial cable with optical fiber or twisted pair cabling.

MoCA 1.0 was approved in 2006, MoCA 1.1 in April 2010, MoCA 2.0 in June 2010, and MoCA 2.5 in April 2016.

Membership 
The Alliance currently has 45 members including pay TV operators, OEMs, CE manufacturers and IC vendors.

MoCA's board of directors consists of Arris, Comcast, Cox Communications, DirecTV, Echostar, Intel, InCoax, MaxLinear and Verizon.

Technology 
Within the scope of the Internet protocol suite, MoCA is a protocol that provides the link layer. In the 7-layer OSI model, it provides definitions within the data link layer (layer 2) and the physical layer (layer 1). DLNA approved of MoCA as a layer 2 protocol. A MoCA network can contain up to 16 nodes for MoCA 1.1 and higher, with a maximum of 8 for MoCA 1.0. The network provides a shared-medium, half-duplex link between all nodes using time-division multiplexing; within each timeslot, any pair of nodes communicates directly with each other using the highest mutually-supported version of the standard.

Versions 

 MoCA 1.0 The first version of the standard, MoCA 1.0, was ratified in 2006 and supports transmission speeds of up to 135 Mb/s.
 MoCA 1.1 MoCA 1.1 provides 175 Mbit/s net throughputs (275 Mbit/s PHY rate) and operates in the 500 to 1500 MHz frequency range.
 MoCA 2.0 MoCA 2.0 offers actual throughputs (MAC rate) up to 1 Gbps. Operating frequency range is 500 to 1650 MHz. Packet error rate is 1 packet error in 100 million. MoCA 2.0 also offers lower power modes of sleep and standby and is backward compatible with MoCA 1.1. In March 2017, SCTE/ISBE society and MoCA consortium began creating a new "standards operational practice" (SCTE 235) to provide MoCA 2.0 with DOCSIS 3.1 interoperability. Interoperability is necessary because both MoCA 2.0 and DOCSIS 3.1 may operate in the frequency range above 1 GHz. The standard "addresses the need to prevent degradation or failure of signals due to a shared frequency range above 1 GHz".
 MoCA 2.5 MoCA 2.5 (introduced April 13, 2016) offers actual data rates up to 2.5 Gbit/s, continues to be backward compatible with MoCA 2.0 and MoCA 1.1, and adds MoCA protected setup (MPS), Management Proxy, Enhanced Privacy, Network wide Beacon Power, and Bridge detection. MoCA Access is intended for multiple dwelling units (MDUs) such as hotels, resorts, hospitals, or educational facilities. It is based on the current MoCA 2.0 standard which is capable of 1 Gbps net throughputs, and MoCA 2.5 which is capable of 2.5 Gbps.
 MoCA 3.0 The MoCA 3.0 standard has been released and increases the maximum throughput to 10 Gbps.

Performance profiles

Frequency band plan 

Notes:
 Channel C4 is commonly used for Verizon FiOS for the "WAN" link from the ONT to the router.
 Channels D1-D8 are commonly used for "LAN" links, between set-top boxes and the router.
 E band channels are commonly used by DirecTV converter boxes. The DirecTV Ethernet-to-Coax Adapter (DECA) uses MoCA on this "Mid-RF" frequency band.
 D10A 100mhz wide means it goes up to 1675Mhz, so splitters need to be 5-1675Mhz

See also 

 Ethernet over coax
 G.hn
 Home gateway
 Home network
 HomePlug Powerline Alliance
 HomePNA
 IEEE 802.3
 IEEE 802.11
 IEEE 1905
 Ultra-high-definition television
 Wireless LAN

References

External links 
 

Computer networking
Computer network organizations
Consumer electronics
Ethernet standards